Tus Besos (Spanish "your kisses") may refer to:

Tus Besos, Miguel Sandoval (composer) 1942
"Tus Besos", hit single by OV7
Tus Besos (Juan Luis Guerra song)
"Tus Besos", song by Cliff Richard, written by L.Newman, adap. by G. Dasca